The Criminal Investigator (Traditional Chinese: O記實錄; lit. The O Files) is a 1995 Hong Kong police procedural television drama. Produced by Jonathan Chik with a screenplay co-written and edited by Chow Yuk-ming, the drama is a TVB production. The story follows a team of investigators from the Organized Crime and Triad Bureau (OCTB) unit of the Royal Hong Kong Police Force.

Characters

OCTB unit

Team A

Other characters
Kenix Kwok as Kenes Ng Chung-lin (伍頌蓮)
Bondy Chiu as Bonnie Wong Ming-wai (王明慧)
Lau Siu-ming as Wong Hong-kwai (王康貴)
Pak Yan as Lai Kit-yu (黎潔如)
Choi Kwok-hing as Lam Sam (林森)
Soh Hang-suen as Ho Mei-ying (何英瑛)

References

TVB dramas
1995 Hong Kong television series debuts
1995 Hong Kong television series endings
Hong Kong action television series
Hong Kong crime television series
Hong Kong police procedural television series
Serial drama television series
1990s Hong Kong television series
Cantonese-language television shows